Reijo Kiiskilä (2 October 1964 – 15 November 2002) was a Finnish weightlifter. He competed in the men's lightweight event at the 1988 Summer Olympics.

References

External links
 

1964 births
2002 deaths
Finnish male weightlifters
Olympic weightlifters of Finland
Weightlifters at the 1988 Summer Olympics
People from Sievi
Sportspeople from North Ostrobothnia
20th-century Finnish people